Rod Daniels is a former TV news anchor at WBAL-TV in Baltimore, Maryland who retired in 2015 after more than 30 years of service at the station.

Daniels graduated from William Paterson University in 1975 with a Bachelor of Arts degree in speech communications; he received a President's Medal award from his alma mater in 2004.

Daniels began his career as a weekend sports anchor at WIS-TV in Columbia, South Carolina. He then moved to WTAE-TV in Pittsburgh as a weekend anchor and reporter, and later to WISN-TV in Milwaukee. He worked at WBAL-TV from 1984 to 2015.

He received the Catholic Archdiocese Medal of Honor for Communications for his coverage of church activities.
 
During Pope John Paul II's visit to Baltimore in 1995, Rod served as host of the celebration at Camden Yards.

References 

Living people
Year of birth missing (living people)
Place of birth missing (living people)
Television anchors from Baltimore